Ivica Mornar (born 12 January 1974) is a Croatian retired footballer. He started as a striker, but was mostly deployed as a winger during his career.

Mornar began his career with Hajduk Split before going on to play for Eintracht Frankfurt, Sevilla, CD Ourense, Standard Liège, Anderlecht and Portsmouth.

Club career
Mornar was born in Split.

In Mornar's final season at Anderlecht, he scored a goal in a 1–1 home draw against Bayern Munich on 30 September 2003.

He was offered a new two-year contract by Anderlecht, but opted to move across the English channel to Portsmouth. He moved to the Premier League at the end of January 2004 for £500,000, signing a two-and-half-year deal.

Mornar made his Pompey debut in a goalless draw at home to Wolverhampton, and looked lively. He then scored his first and only goal in the next game against Tottenham. He played as a winger in most of his Portsmouth appearances.

However, Mornar failed to recreate his previous form at Portsmouth. Seemingly out of the picture at the club, he was loaned to Rennes of the French Ligue 1 for the 2004–05 season, with then Pompey manager Harry Redknapp saying that he would allow Mornar to be sold upon his return. Although it appeared that Mornar was in new boss Alain Perrin's plans for the 2005–06 campaign, he was thwarted by hamstring injuries throughout the season. Upon the return of Harry Redknapp as manager in December 2005 it looked as though Mornar's contract would be allowed to expire the next Summer. However, it transpired that there was a clause in his contract guaranteeing him a further year at the club should relegation be avoided and he remained a Portsmouth player, until September 2006 when his contract with the club was cancelled by mutual consent. This brought further complications due to the fact that Mornar could not find a club willing to sign him. Despite his unceremonious exit from Portsmouth he enjoyed his time playing there and persuaded fellow Split native Niko Kranjčar to join the club. Reportedly he offered his services to first league teams from Belgium, Scotland, Portugal and Japan but no team was interested, thereby forcing his retirement.

International career
Mornar made his debut for Croatia in a March 1994 friendly match away against Spain, coming on as a 46th-minute substitute for Janko Janković, but was replaced himself by Ante Miše after being on the pitch for just over half an hour. He was capped 22 times and scored one goal for his country against England. Mornar represented Croatia at Euro 2004. His final international was a September 2004 World Cup qualification match against Hungary.

Career statistics

Club

International goals

Honours

Club
Hajduk Split
 Prva HNL (3): 1992, 1993–94, 1994–95
 Croatian Cup (2): 1992–93, 1994–95
 Croatian Supercup (2): 1993, 1994

Sevilla
Trofeo Colombino (1): 1996

R.S.C. Anderlecht
 Belgian First Division (1): 2003–04
 Belgian Super Cup (1): 2001

References

External links
 
 Archive of Hajduk's matches

1974 births
Living people
Footballers from Split, Croatia
Association football forwards
Croatian footballers
Croatia under-21 international footballers
Croatia international footballers
UEFA Euro 2004 players
HNK Hajduk Split players
Eintracht Frankfurt players
Sevilla FC players
CD Ourense footballers
Standard Liège players
R.S.C. Anderlecht players
Portsmouth F.C. players
Stade Rennais F.C. players
Croatian Football League players
Bundesliga players
La Liga players
Segunda División players
Belgian Pro League players
Premier League players
Ligue 1 players
Croatian expatriate footballers
Expatriate footballers in Germany
Expatriate footballers in Spain
Expatriate footballers in Belgium
Expatriate footballers in England
Expatriate footballers in France
Croatian expatriate sportspeople in Germany
Croatian expatriate sportspeople in Spain
Croatian expatriate sportspeople in Belgium
Croatian expatriate sportspeople in England
Croatian expatriate sportspeople in France